The 1951 Arizona State–Flagstaff Lumberjacks football team was an American football team that represented Arizona State College at Flagstaff (now known as Northern Arizona University) in the Border Conference during the 1951 college football season. In its first year under head coach John Pederson, the team compiled a 1–7 record (0–1 against conference opponents), was outscored by a total of 211 to 76, and finished last of eight teams in the Border Conference.

The team played its home games at Skidmore Field in Flagstaff, Arizona.

Schedule

References

Arizona State-Flagstaff
Northern Arizona Lumberjacks football seasons
Arizona State-Flagstaff Lumberjacks football